The 2020 Oregon Secretary of State election was held on November 3, 2020, to elect the Oregon Secretary of State, the highest office in the state after the governor. Incumbent Republican Bev Clarno had agreed not to run for a full term. Clarno was appointed by Governor Kate Brown to replace Dennis Richardson, who died of cancer during his term.

Republican primary

Candidates

Declared 
 Kim Thatcher, state senator for Oregon's 13th Senate district
 Dave Stuaffer, environmental engineer, candidate for Governor of Oregon in 2016 (as a Democrat) and in 2018 (as a Republican)

Declined 
 Rich Vial, former state representative for Oregon's 26th House district and former deputy Secretary of State

Endorsements

Results

Democratic primary

Candidates

Declared 
 Shemia Fagan, state senator for Oregon's 24th Senate district
 Mark Hass, state senator for Oregon's 14th Senate district

Withdrawn 
 Jamie Morrison (withdrew candidacy effective February 28, 2020 to run for District 18 in the Oregon House of Representatives)
 Cameron Smith, former Director of Oregon Department of Consumer and Business Services and Oregon Department of Veterans' Affairs (withdrew candidacy effective March 10, 2020)
 Jennifer Williamson, former Majority Leader of the Oregon House of Representatives and former state Representative for District 36 (withdrew candidacy effective February 26, 2020)
 Ryan Wruck, office manager (withdrew candidacy effective November 8, 2019, endorsed Mark Hass)

Endorsements

Results

General election

Predictions

Results

See also 

 Oregon Secretary of State
 2020 Oregon state elections

References 

Secretary of State
Oregon Secretary of State elections
Oregon